Mass Grave Aesthetics is a 19-minute EP containing a single song, recorded by the French black metal band Deathspell Omega. Mass Grave Aesthetics was released through Norma Evangelium Diaboli on 8 December 2008. It was also reissued with Diabolus Absconditus on a vinyl LP in 2011.

The song "Mass Grave Aesthetics" was originally released as the final track of the four-way split album From the Entrails to the Dirt, which was released in 2005.

The song's epigram is taken from the writings of the French poet and polemicist Laurent Tailhade.

Track listing 

 "Mass Grave Aesthetics" – 19:43

Deathspell Omega albums
2008 EPs